The Cetea is a left tributary of the river Galda in Romania. It discharges into the Galda in Benic.

References

Rivers of Romania
Rivers of Alba County